Copestake Peak is a peak rising to  on the south side of Neumayer Glacier, South Georgia. It was named by the UK Antarctic Place-Names Committee for Paul Goodall-Copestake, who was British Antarctic Survey biological assistant at Grytviken, 1980–82, and Station Commander at Bird Island, 1982–83.

References
 

Mountains and hills of South Georgia